The five hundred naira Nigerian note is a denomination of Nigerian currency. It was introduced in April 2001, and it was the highest currency in Nigeria when it was introduced.

The obverse of the note features a portrait of Nnamdi Azikiwe. The reverse features an off-shore oil rig.

References

Naira, 500 note
Naira
2001 introductions
2001 in Nigeria